Demon Flower is the eighth studio album by Australian rock band, Hunters & Collectors and was released on 16 May 1994.  It was co-produced by the band with Nick Mainsbridge, reaching No. 2 on the ARIA Albums Chart and was certified Gold by the Australian Recording Industry Association. It also peaked at No. 9 on the New Zealand Albums Chart.

Background 

Demon Flower was released by Hunters & Collectors as their eighth studio album on 16 May 1994, which was co-produced by the band with Nick Mainsbridge (The Triffids, Martha's Vineyard, Ratcat). The line-up of the group was John Archer on bass guitar, P.A., backing vocals; Doug Falconer on drums, backing vocals, programming, and percussion; Jack Howard on trumpet, keyboards and backing vocals; Robert Miles on live sound and art design; Barry Palmer on lead guitar; Mark Seymour on lead vocals and guitar; Jeremy Smith on French horn, keyboards, guitars and backing vocals; and Michael Waters on keyboards and trombone.

Archer told The Canberra Times Naomi Mapstone that he felt the album had "less kind of studio stuff. I think it's a lot more adventurous, even though the last one sounded really full-on and dense, it was actually quite a safe record in a lot of ways ... We had a lot more fun with the sounds on this one". Australian musicologist, Ian McFarlane noticed that it "featured a stronger emphasis on guitars".

It debuted at No. 2 in Australia – their highest charting album – and No. 9 in New Zealand. Demon Flowers lead single "Easy", was issued a month ahead of the album's release and peaked at No. 38 on both countries singles charts. The three subsequent singles however all failed to chart. Seymour describes the band's frustration in the liner notes of Natural Selection, when discussing the fourth single, "The One and Only", "We’d launch into tracks like this one… an absolute live monster, and getting a response would be like trying to raise the dead. The radio recognition factor was crucial. Practically speaking, there wasn’t any radio after Holy Grail. Go figure."

The album was remastered and reissued by Liberation Music on 11 August 2003.

Reception 

Naomi Mapstone of The Canberra Times reviewed Demon Flower in June 1994 and noted that "[the band] seem to have, taken a deep breath, cleared their heads and, got back in touch with the vitality that was a hallmark of-earlier albums Human Frailty and The Jaws of Life". In December that year her fellow journalist, Nicole Leedham, rated Demon Flower as the Best Album of the year.

Track listing

Charts

Certifications

Personnel

Credited to:
Hunters & Collectors
 John Archer – bass guitar, P.A., backing vocals
 Doug Falconer – drums, percussion, programming, backing vocals
 Jack Howard – trumpet, keyboards, backing vocals
 Robert Miles- – live sound, art director
 Barry Palmer – lead guitar
 Mark Seymour – lead vocals, guitars, mandolin
 Jeremy Smith – French horn, guitars, keyboards, mandolin, backing vocals
 Michael Waters – trombone, keyboards

Production details
 Producer – Hunters & Collectors, Nick Mainsbridge (Absolute Productions)
 Engineer – Nick Mainsbridge
 Assistant engineer – Lawrence Maddy, Anthony Cook
 Mastering – Don Bartley
 Mixed by – Mark Freegard for 140db
 Assistant mixer – Kalju Tonuma
 Studios – Sing Sing Studios, Melbourne (recording); Studio's 301, Sydney (mastering); Platinum Studios, Melbourne (mixing)

Track-by-track instrument credits 
"Easy"
 Archer – bass guitar
 Falconer – drums
 Howard – keyboards
 Palmer – lead guitar
 Seymour – lead vocals, backing vocals, rhythm guitar
 Smith – guitar, backing vocals
 Waters – trombone
 Mark Freegard – rhythm guitar

"Panic in the Shade"
 Archer – bass guitar
 Howard – trumpet
 Palmer – lead guitar, noise guitar
 Seymour – lead vocals, backing vocals
 Smith – big riff, drum programming, noise guitar, rhythm guitar

"Back in the Hole"
 Archer – bass guitar
 Falconer – drums
 Palmer – lead guitar, buzz guitar
 Seymour – lead vocals, backing vocals, acoustic guitar
 Smith – guitar
 Waters – keyboards

"The One and Only You"
 Archer – bass guitar
 Falconer – drums
 Howard – trumpet
 Palmer – lead guitar, slide guitar
 Seymour – lead vocals, guitar
 Seymour – lead vocalsorgan
 Waters – trombone

"Mr. Bigmouth"
 Archer – bass guitar
 Falconer – drums
 Howard – trumpet
 Palmer – lead guitar
 Seymour – lead vocals
 Smith – keyboards
 Waters – trombone

"Courtship of America"
 Archer – bass guitar
 Falconer – drums
 Howard – trumpet
 Palmer – acoustic guitar, electric guitar
 Seymour – lead vocals, acoustic guitar
 Smith – keyboards, French horn, string programming, guitar, tambourine

"Drop in the Ocean"
 Archer – bass guitar
 Falconer – drums
 Palmer – fuzz guitar, tremolo
 Seymour – lead vocals, backing vocals, rhythm guitar
 Smith – guitar

"Newborn"
 Archer – bass guitar
 Falconer – drums
 Howard – trumpet
 Palmer – distorted guitar
 Seymour – lead vocals, acoustic guitar
 Smith – mandolin, French horn, clean guitar, acoustic guitar, hammond, backing vocals
 Waters – trombone

"Tender"
 Archer – bass guitar
 Falconer – drums
 Howard – keyboards
 Palmer – lead guitar
 Seymour – lead vocals, backing vocals, guitar
 Smith – guitar

"Desert Where Her Heart Is"
 Archer – bass guitar
 Falconer – drums
 Howard – trumpet
 Palmer – guitars
 Seymour – lead vocals, backing vocals, rhythm guitar
 Smith – acoustic guitar, French horn
 Waters – trombone

"Betrayer"
 Archer – bass guitar
 Falconer – drums
 Howard – trumpet
 Palmer – lead guitar
 Seymour – lead vocals
 Smith – guitar, French horn
 Waters – trombone

"Ladykiller"
 Archer – bass guitar
 Falconer – drums, drum programming, percussion
 Howard – trumpet
 Palmer – electric guitar, slide guitar
 Seymour – lead vocals, mandolin, acoustic guitar
 Smith – acoustic guitar, piano, mandolin, string programming
 Nick Mainsbridge- drum programming

References 

1994 albums
Hunters & Collectors albums
Mushroom Records albums